Cranesville is an unincorporated community in Preston County, West Virginia, United States.

History
The first permanent settlement at Cranesville was made in the 1850s. The community was named for John Crane, proprietor.

The Reckart Mill, which is listed on the National Register of Historic Places, is located near Cranesville.

References

Unincorporated communities in Preston County, West Virginia
Unincorporated communities in West Virginia